The Hellbilly Deluxe 2 World Tour was a worldwide concert tour by American rock band Rob Zombie that began in October 2009 in support of his fourth studio album Hellbilly Deluxe 2. The tour consisted of 12 legs spanning across Japan, North America, Europe and Australia. The tour marked the first time Zombie has performed internationally since the beginning of his solo career.

Overview
After the completion of the Hellbilly Deluxe 2 recording sessions, Zombie announced that his live band and himself were heading to Japan to co-headline the Loudpark Festival in Chiba on October 18, 2009 preceded by two headlining performance in Tokyo and Osaka. The performances debuted several songs from the upcoming record and marked Zombie's first ever solo appearances in the country.

After returning from Japan, Zombie embarked on a tour of North America, dubbed The Hellbilly Deluxe 2 Tour despite the album being several months from release. Nekromantix and Captain Clegg & the Night Creatures, the fictional band from Halloween II, served as the opening acts for all dates. Another fictional character from the film, Uncle Seymour Coffins, hosted the Los Angeles show on Halloween. The tour supported Zombie's unreleased album of the same name. The tour spanned from late October to early December. It was also the last leg of the tour to feature Tommy Clufetos on drums who left the band after the release of Hellbilly Deluxe 2 to join Ozzy Osbourne.

After months of silence from the band and Zombie himself, it was announced in early March that drummer Tommy Clufetos had left the group to join Ozzy Osbourne. Shortly after, it was announced that he had been replaced by Slipknot drummer Joey Jordison.

Zombie had expressed interest in touring with Alice Cooper for 15 years. The two united to create the Gruesome Twosome Tour, which spanned 17 co-headlining dates across North America. "The tour worked brilliantly and I'd love to do more of it," enthused Alice, "but it's a case of schedules. It took long enough to get those dates together."

In addition, Zombie performed three festival dates and performed at the Revolver Golden Gods Awards ceremony. The Gruesome Twosome tour was Zombie's first to feature Joey Jordison, who replaced Tommy Clufetos. The tour began to incorporate a new stage setting and use of theatrics, much similar to Zombie's earlier tours. The band also filmed the video for Mars Needs Women during this leg of the tour.

After the culmination of the Gruesome Twosome tour, the band took a short break as Jordison returned to his primary project, the Murderdolls. The band was announced to be co-headlining the 2010 iteration of Mayhem Festival with Korn. The festival marked the first time the two bands have toured with each other in 11 years. The tour spanned 26 dates across the United States and Canada. The tour began on July 10 and concluded on August 14. The band also scheduled signings at the Roadrunner tent on every stop of the tour. During the opening date in San Bernardino, the band were criticised for performing Werewolf Women of the SS, which featured swastikas on the stage video screens. They dropped the song for the remaining dates of the festival. While performing in North Carolina, John 5 jumped off a riser and broke his foot. Despite the injury, he continued to perform and finish the set. He stated that this incident will not prevent him from performing the rest of the tour.

While in Mountain View, California, a local San Francisco radio station conducted an interview with Joey Jordison. During this interview, Jordison announced that Rob Zombie, Alice Cooper and Jordison's current band the Murderdolls will be touring together in the same manner as Zombie and Cooper's previous tour, The Gruesome Twosome tour. The upcoming tour has been dubbed the Halloween Hootenanny tour. Jordison also stated that he will be performing double duties on the tour, drumming for Zombie and playing rhythm guitar for the Murderdolls. Zombie had also previously announced in an interview conducted while on the Mayhem Festival that he was going to be embarking on a Halloween tour, but no more details were revealed. John 5 and Zombie both later confirmed the tour on their Twitter pages. Tour dates were slowly revealed through Zombie's official website.

While on the road with the Mayhem Festival, both Rob Zombie and John 5 confirmed that the band will be embarking on a tour of Europe after the completion of the Halloween Hootenanny Tour with Alice Cooper. This was later simplified down into a tour of the United Kingdom rather than the whole of Europe. John 5 recently confirmed in an interview, for the purpose of promoting the band's appearance at the Soundwave Festival in Australia, that the band will begin their tour of the UK before embarking on their Australian leg of the tour. Several dates spanning across the UK were confirmed through Zombie's official website. The band will be supported by labelmates Skindred and Revoker.

The band again took a short break after the completion of the Mayhem Festival as Jordison once again returned to perform with the Murderdolls in Europe. Upon his return from Europe, he returned to perform with Zombie who had once again teamed up with Alice Cooper for the Halloween Hootenanny tour, a co-headlining tour which would also be supported by the Murderdolls. Jordison performed double duties on the tour, drumming for Zombie and playing guitar for the Murderdolls. Black Label Society, Children of Bodom and Clutch supported Zombie and Cooper on October 17 by merging the Black Label Berzerkus Tour with the Halloween Hootenanny Tour for one night only.

Zombie then took the rest of the year off to work on his upcoming film, the Lords of Salem. After the completion of the script, Zombie performed three small club shows in the United States in early February before heading to the United Kingdom and Australia. A show originally planned in Reno, Nevada was cancelled due to illness. Jordison was unable to perform these dates as he was touring in Europe with the Murderdolls at the time. Zombie recruited former Marilyn Manson drummer Ginger Fish to sit in for Jordison for the shows. Zombie then returned to the United Kingdom for the first time in 12 years for a tour that completely sold out in record time.

A day before the first announcement of bands scheduled to perform at the Soundwave Festival in Australia was due to be announced, the entire line-up was leaked onto the internet which featured Rob Zombie among with many other artists. Iron Maiden, Queens of the Stone Age and One Day as a Lion are set to headline the event which Zombie will co-headline with Slash, Primus, Thirty Seconds To Mars, Slayer, Stone Sour, Avenged Sevenfold, Bullet For My Valentine, Social Distortion and others. Joey Jordison's current band, the Murderdolls, are also scheduled to perform at the festival. He will be performing double duty with Zombie and the Murderdolls in the same manner as the Halloween Hootenanny Tour.

Zombie then travelled to Australia for his first ever solo tour in the country to co-headline the Soundwave Festival alongside bands such as the Murderdolls, Iron Maiden, Queens of the Stone Age, Slayer and others. Drummer Joey Jordison performed double-duty with Zombie and the Murderdolls, similar to the Halloween Hootenanny Tour. He had stated during an interview that he would return with his band within the next couple of years for a headlining tour of his own. Jordison left the band at the end of this leg to return his focus on the Murderdolls before returning to Slipknot later in the year. Ginger Fish, who had previously filled in for Jordison on drumming duties, was announced as his permanent replacement.

Zombie embarked on a second leg of Europe in June consisting of many festival appearances and headlining performances. The band received support from Wayne Static and Loaded (select dates) for this leg of the tour. Zombie used a scaled down production for all of the European tour dates except for his headlining performance at the Download Festival which featured use of his well renowned pyrotechnics, video displays and stage props. The last 5 dates of the tour were cancelled due to personal reasons, the latter being that the band needed to return to the United States. Zombie will then return to North America for a co-headlining tour with Slayer and supported by Exodus.

Tour dates

 1^ = Performance at the Revolver Golden Gods Awards ceremony
 2^ = Co-headlining performance at Lazerfest
 3^ = Headlining performance, not a part of the Soundwave Festival
 4^ = Rescheduled from February 8, 2011
 5^ = Headlining performance with Slayer

Cancelled dates

 1   Dates cancelled due to the band needing to return to the United States

Personnel
 Rob Zombie – vocals
 John 5 – guitar
 Piggy D. – bass guitar, vocals
 Ginger Fish – drums, percussion  (February 6, 2011 – February 10, 2011; May 25, 2011 – August 6, 2011) 
 Joey Jordison – drums, percussion  (April 8, 2010 – December 18, 2010; February 16, 2011 – March 7, 2011) 
 Tommy Clufetos – drums, percussion  (October 15, 2009 – December 5, 2009)

Songs performed

Originals

"American Witch"
"Demon Speeding"
"Demonoid Phenomenon"
"Dragula"
"House of 1000 Corpses"
"Jesus Frankenstein"
"Let It All Bleed Out"
"Living Dead Girl"
"Mars Needs Women"
"Never Gonna Stop (The Red Red Kroovy)"
"Pussy Liquor"
"Scum of the Earth"
"Sick Bubblegum"
"Superbeast"
"The Devil's Rejects"
"The Lords of Salem"
"Werewolf Women of the SS"
"What?"
"What Lurks on Channel X?"

Covers
"Beat It" (Michael Jackson) (snippet)
"Black or White" (Michael Jackson) (snippet)
"Boats n' Hoes" (Step Brothers) (snippet)
"Creature of the Wheel" (White Zombie)
"Electric Head, Pt. 2 (The Ecstasy)" (White Zombie)
"Enter Sandman" (Metallica)
"Heartbreaker" (Led Zeppelin) (snippet)
"Highway to Hell" (AC/DC) (snippet)
"Jesse's Girl" (Rick Springfield) (snippet)
"More Human than Human" (White Zombie)
"School's Out" (Alice Cooper)
"Super-Charger Heaven" (White Zombie)
"Sweet Dreams" (Marilyn Manson)
"Thunderkiss '65" (White Zombie)

Support acts
 Alice Cooper (Co-Headliner) (April 26 – May 22, 2010; September 30 – October 24, 2010)
 Black Label Society (October 17, 2010)
 Captain Clegg & The Night Creatures (October 29 – December 5, 2009)
 Children of Bodom (October 17, 2010)
 Clutch (October 17, 2010)
 Dommin (March 3, 2011)
 Duff McKagan's Loaded (June 6, 2011)
 Eyes Set To Kill (February 6–10, 2011)
 Exodus (July 20 – August 6, 2011)
 Lacuna Coil (May 11–25, 2012)
 Megadeth (Co-Headliner) (May 11–26, 2012)
 Monster Magnet (March 3, 2011)
 Murderdolls (September 30 – October 24, 2010; March 3, 2011)
 Nekromantix (October 29 – December 5, 2009)
 Revoker (February 16–22, 2011)
 Slayer (Co-Headliner) (July 20 – August 6, 2011)
 Skindred (February 16–22, 2011)
 Wayne Static (June 6–30, 2011)

References

External links
  Gruesome Twosome Tour Website

2009 concert tours
2010 concert tours
2011 concert tours
2012 concert tours
Rob Zombie concert tours